Capital School District is a public school district in Kent County, Delaware in the United States. It serves the greater Dover area.

Geography
The district covers a  area in central Kent County.

Communities served include the majority of Dover, as well as Cheswold, Hartly, Little Creek, and most of Leipsic.

It also serves the Delaware side of Marydel.

School Board
President:  Dr. Chanda Jackson-Short

Vice President:  Sean P.M. Christiansen

Members: Anthony DePrima, Felicia Duggins, John Martin

History
Capital School District was formed in 1969 through the consolidation of the Dover Special, Hartly, Rose Valley, and Wiley's school districts and the William Henry Comprehensive School.

Schools

High Schools (Grades 9-12)

Middle Schools (Grades 5-8)

Elementary Schools (Grades K-4)

Other

Awards and achievements
Three schools in the district have been recognized as National Blue Ribbon Schools of Excellence.

Dover High School (1986)
Booker T. Washington Elementary (2005)
Fairview Elementary (2006)

Capital School District also has nine National Board Certified Professionals.

Unions
The Capital Educators Association (CEA) is the teachers' union for this school district. Lee Olmstead currently serves as President.

References

School districts in Kent County, Delaware
1925 establishments in Delaware
School districts established in 1925
Dover, Delaware